Club 57 is a television series developed by Rainbow SpA and Nickelodeon, which were both part of Viacom at the time. It was created by Catharina Ledoboer and produced by Iginio Straffi and Pierluigi Gazzolo. The series premiered on Rai Gulp in Italy on 15 April 2019, followed by its debut on Nickelodeon Latin America on 6 May 2019. The show follows a student from the 21st century named Eva (Evaluna Montaner) who accidentally travels to the year 1957. After Eva falls in love with an Italian greaser named JJ (Riccardo Frascari), she decides to stay in the past.

The show's first season was green-lit after Iginio Straffi held a meeting with other Nickelodeon creatives. Straffi wanted to co-develop another series with Nickelodeon after Winx Club. He watched an unaired pilot episode for Club 57, which was filmed at Viacom's Miami studio in 2016. Straffi took an interest in the concept, and at his direction, the show's male lead (JJ) was written as an Italian immigrant. Series creator Catharina Ledoboer worked closely with the Italian team during all aspects of production in order to suit the program for a European audience. Iginio Straffi brought over many of his former crew members from Winx Club to work on Club 57, including most of the writing staff and design team.

The first sixty episodes were recorded over a period of six months, beginning in the Apulia region of Italy in September 2018 and continuing in Miami, Florida. During filming, the cast members studied films from the 1950s in order to accurately represent the time period. Riccardo Frascari, a native Italian speaker, learned the Spanish language for his role as JJ. The series' music was composed by Evaluna Montaner's father, Ricardo Montaner; her brothers, Mau and Ricky Montaner; and her fiancé, Camilo Echeverry. Club 57 premiered with high ratings, becoming the top-rated program in its time slot on Viacom's Telefe in May 2019.

In October 2019, Rainbow SpA's Andrea Graciotti stated that a second season was in development. Second season premiered in Latin America on Nickelodeon with its first 30 episodes between 14 June and 23 July 2021, last 30 episodes premiered between 13 September and 22 October 2021. There's no air date for season 2 in Italy.

Premise 
Eva (Evaluna Montaner) and Ruben (Sebastián Silva) are two siblings from the year 2019. After discovering an old time machine in their grandfather's laboratory, they accidentally send themselves back to the year 1957. As they try to find a way to return, Eva and Ruben initially try to stay as unnoticed as possible. Eva soon falls in love with an Italian boy named JJ (Riccardo Frascari), who works as a lighting technician for a popular dance show called Club 57. Eva also becomes friends with the show's lead performer, Amelia (Isabella Castillo), and provokes the ire of JJ's ex-girlfriend, Vero (Carolina Mestrovic). Not wanting to leave JJ, Eva decides to stay longer in the past. Meanwhile, Ruben starts selling his technology to his grandfather (Andrés Mercado), who is in his twenties in 1957.

Eva and Ruben's presence in 1957 attracts the attention of the Guardians of Time, a group of interdimensional agents monitoring the universe's timeline. They send an apprentice guardian named Aurek (Martín Barba) and his robotic assistant Droide (Jonathan Quintana) to catch the two siblings and stop their disruptions in the past. Eva and Ruben evade their capture and eventually return to 2019, but there they find that their actions in the past have had a butterfly effect on the present: their parents are no longer together and their grandfather is a spiteful millionaire. Eva and Ruben return to the past to undo their actions and recover their old lives.

Cast

Main 
 Evaluna Montaner as Eva
 Riccardo Frascari as JJ
 Sebastián Silva as Ruben
 Carolina Mestrovic as Vero
 Martín Barba as Aurek
 Isabella Castillo as Amelia
 Andrés Mercado as Manuel

Recurring 
 Estefany Oliveira as Mercedes and Delaila
 Santiago Achaga as Tiago (season 2)
 Jonathan Freudman as Droide and Miguel
 Carlotta Bizzo as Francesca
 Lorenzo Maida as Nico
 Laura Rosguer as Maca
 Simone Marval as Isa
 Ángela Rincón as Sofía
 Adriano Zendejas as Víctor
 Martina Lavignasse as Diana
 Santiago Bidart as Abel
 Mauricio Novoa as Checho
 Gael Sánchez as César
 Jesús Nasser as Fernando
 Frank Fernández as Andrés
 Gabriel López as Oso and Barba Negra
 Jorge Roguez as René
 Martha Picanes as the Cat Lady (Vero in the future)
 Luis Mayer as Xavier
 Xavier Coronel as Manuel in the future

Development

Production 

Co-productions between Rainbow SpA and Nickelodeon, both part of Viacom, began in 2010 when they made new episodes of Winx Club together. At a 2017 meeting, Nickelodeon executives presented Rainbow's founder Iginio Straffi with potential follow-up projects to jointly produce. One was the pilot episode for Club 57, which was produced at Viacom's Miami studio in 2016. Rainbow held discussions with RAI to garner financial support for the show. In December 2017, Nickelodeon officially greenlit the series for a full season of 75 episodes, an order which was later reduced to 60 episodes.

At the direction of Rainbow, series creator Catharina Ledoboer rewrote the show's original outline to portray the character JJ as a 1950s Italian immigrant. Nickelodeon's vice president of programming, Tatiana Rodriguez, said in 2018 that this change helped the script have "greater depth." Ledoboer stated that "from the cast, the writing, all the way to the songs, Rainbow had a very important influence on the series to ensure that their audience would like it, not only in Italy but in the wider European community."

The show began filming on 24 September 2018 in the Italian city of Monopoli, Apulia. All of the show's exterior shots were filmed in the city of Martina Franca. Filming continued for six months, moving to Viacom's studio in Miami and involving an international cast of actors from the United States, Latin America, and Italy. Iginio Straffi, who produced the series alongside Pierluigi Gazzolo, commented that the multilingual cast "created real friendships... They have real chemistry. That was experiment number one accomplished!"

In total, over 2,700 minutes of footage were shot across 118 days of filming. After work on the first season wrapped, Iginio Straffi spoke about Rainbow and Nickelodeon's ongoing productions and said, "the know-how of Rainbow and the know-how of Nickelodeon are very complementary; the sensibilities of the Americans, with our European touch."

Casting 

Actress and singer Evaluna Montaner was cast as the lead character, Eva. During the casting period, Montaner's father received a message from a friend, telling him that the show's lead role seemed fit for his daughter. Montaner's manager recommended that she audition for the character, who was named "Luca" at the time and renamed Eva after Evaluna got the part. For the show, Montaner sang multiple songs in both Spanish and Italian. Her father, brothers, and fiancé composed the music, continuing the Montaner family's tradition of creating songs together.

Riccardo Frascari, a native Italian, was cast as the show's male lead, JJ. Frascari first learned about the show in May 2018, when he was notified of a new Rainbow project looking for Italian actors who could dance, sing, and speak Spanish. Frascari sent Rainbow a video presentation of him singing a Spanish song, but he could not fluently speak the language at the time. After being cast as JJ, Frascari took an intensive Spanish class to become fluent.

With the exception of Evaluna Montaner and Sebastián Silva, most of the show's actors were given a list of 1950s films to study so that their characters would act like those from the time period. The cast members even took courses that covered "how they walked in the 50s, how they talked in the 50s, and what they ate." Montaner and Silva, whose characters Eva and Ruben are from the 21st century, were left out of the instruction so that their surprised reactions to the 1950s customs would come more naturally.

Episodes

Reception 
When Club 57 was replayed on Viacom's Telefe network, it became the highest-rated program in its timeslot from May to July 2019, reaching a total of 17.8 million viewers. According to data from IBOPE Media, the Nickelodeon broadcast of Club 57 ranked as the top-rated program in Argentina and Mexico among the target audience of viewers aged 4–11. It also ranked as the second highest-rated series in Brazil and Colombia in the same age group. On the "Nick Play" mobile application, streams of the first season reached over 1.8 million viewers. On Nickelodeon's YouTube channel, music video clips from Club 57 achieved a combined total of over 30 million views, as of August 2019.

At RAI's Pulcinella Awards festival in Positano, Italy, Club 57 was nominated as the best live-action/hybrid TV series of 2019. At the 2019 Kids' Choice Awards Mexico, the series received multiple nominations: Favorite TV Show, Evaluna Montaner as Favorite Actress, and Riccardo Frascari and Sebastián Silva as Favorite Actor.

Related media

Merchandise 
In March 2019, Rainbow SpA announced a set of tie-in books based on the show, including a 128-page novel written from Eva's point of view. The books were released in Italy on 10 July 2019. Rainbow also launched a Club 57 magazine in October of the same year.

Live events 
At the 2019 Giffoni Film Festival, Rainbow SpA held a "Rainbow Day" event featuring a performance from Riccardo Frascari as JJ. Then-unaired episodes of Winx Club and Club 57 were screened for the festival's jurors, and Frascari appeared for a question-and-answer session with fans.

On 30 November 2019, a live stage musical based on the series opened at the Teatro Gran Rex. It featured most of the television cast and all of the show's original songs. The stage show's plot was described by Billboard as a "spin-off" taking place after the first season's story.

Notes

References

External links 
 
 
 Club 57 on RaiPlay Italia
 Club 57 videos from Rainbow

American telenovelas
2019 American television series debuts
2019 Italian television series debuts
2010s time travel television series
Spanish-language Nickelodeon original programming
Italian television series
Nickelodeon telenovelas
Spanish-language television shows
2019 telenovelas
2020 telenovelas
Teen telenovelas
Television series set in the 1950s
Fiction set in 1957
Television series set in 2019
Television series by Rainbow S.r.l.
Spanish-language American telenovelas
Television shows filmed in Miami
Spanish-language television programming in the United States